The Chicano Movement, also referred to as El Movimiento, was a social and political movement in the United States inspired by prior acts of resistance among people of Mexican descent, especially of Pachucos in the 1940s and 1950s, and the Black Power movement, that worked to embrace a Chicano/a identity and worldview that combated structural racism, encouraged cultural revitalization, and achieved community empowerment by rejecting assimilation. 
Before this, Chicano/a had been a term of derision, adopted by some Pachucos as an expression of defiance to Anglo-American society. With the rise of Chicanismo, Chicano/a became a reclaimed term in the 1960s and 1970s, used to express political autonomy, ethnic and cultural solidarity, and pride in being of Indigenous descent, diverging from the assimilationist Mexican-American identity. Chicanos also expressed solidarity and defined their culture through the development of Chicano art during El Movimiento, and stood firm in preserving their religion.

The Chicano Movement was influenced by and entwined with the Black Power movement, and both movements held similar objectives of community empowerment and liberation while also calling for Black-Brown unity. Leaders such as César Chávez, Reies Tijerina, and Rodolfo Gonzales learned strategies of resistance and worked with leaders of the Black Power movement. Chicano organizations like the Brown Berets and Mexican American Youth Organization (MAYO) were influenced by the political agenda of Black activist organizations such as the Black Panthers. Chicano political demonstrations, such as the East L.A. Walkouts and the Chicano Moratorium, occurred in collaboration with Black students and activists.

Similar to the Black Power movement, the Chicano Movement experienced heavy state surveillance, infiltration, and repression from U.S. government informants and agent provocateurs through organized activities such as COINTELPRO. Movement leaders like Rosalio Muñoz were ousted from their positions of leadership by government agents, organizations such as MAYO and the Brown Berets were infiltrated, and political demonstrations such as the Chicano Moratorium became sites of police brutality, which led to the decline of the movement by the mid-1970s. 
Other reasons for the movement's decline include its centering of the masculine subject, which marginalized and excluded Chicanas, and a growing disinterest in Chicano nationalist constructs such as Aztlán.

Origins

The Chicano Movement encompassed a broad list of issues—from restoration of land grants, to farm workers' rights, to enhanced education, to voting and political ethnic stereotypes of Mexicans in mass media and the American consciousness. In an article in The Journal of American History, Edward J. Escobar describes some of the negativity of the time:

The conflict between Chicanos and the LAPD thus helped Mexican Americans develop a new political consciousness that included a greater sense of ethnic solidarity, an acknowledgment of their subordinated status in American society, and a greater determination to act politically, and perhaps even violently, to end that subordination. While most people of Mexican descent still refused to call themselves Chicanos, many had come to adopt many of the principles intrinsic in the concept of chicanismo.

Early in the twentieth century, Mexican Americans formed organizations to protect themselves from discrimination. One of those organizations, the League of United Latin American Citizens, was formed in 1929 and remains active today. The movement gained momentum after World War II when groups such as the American G.I. Forum (AGIF), which was founded by returning Mexican American veteran Dr. Hector P. Garcia, joined in the efforts by other civil rights organizations. The AGIF first received national exposure when it took on the cause of Felix Longoria, a Mexican American serviceman who was denied a funeral service in his hometown of Three Rivers, Texas after being killed during WWII. After the Longoria incident, the AGIF quickly expanded throughout Texas, and by the 1950s, chapters were founded across the U.S.

Mexican American civil rights activists also achieved several major legal victories including the 1947 Mendez v. Westminster court case ruling which declared that segregating children of "Mexican and Latin descent" was unconstitutional and the 1954 Hernandez v. Texas ruling which declared that Mexican Americans and other historically-subordinated groups in the United States were entitled to equal protection under the 14th Amendment of the U.S. Constitution.

Throughout the country, the Chicano Movement was defined by several different leaders. In New Mexico, there was Reies López Tijerina who worked on the land grant movement. He fought to regain control of what he considered ancestral lands. He became involved in civil rights causes within six years and also became a cosponsor of the Poor People's March on Washington in 1967. In Texas, war veteran Dr. Hector P. Garcia founded the American GI Forum and was later appointed to the United States Commission on Civil Rights. In Denver, Rodolfo "Corky" Gonzáles helped define the meaning of being a Chicano through his poem Yo Soy Joaquin (I am Joaquin). In California, César Chávez and the farm workers turned to the struggle of urban youth, and created political awareness and participated in La Raza Unida Party.

The most prominent civil rights organization in the Mexican-American community is the Mexican American Legal Defense and Educational Fund (MALDEF), founded in 1968. Although modeled after the NAACP Legal Defense and Educational Fund, MALDEF has also taken on many of the functions of other organizations, including political advocacy and training of local leaders.

Some women who worked for the Chicano movement felt that members were being too concerned with social issues that affected the Chicano community, instead of addressing problems that affected Chicana women specifically. This led Chicana women to form the Comisión Femenil Mexicana Nacional. In 1975, it became involved in the case Madrigal v. Quilligan, obtaining a moratorium on the compulsory sterilization of women and adoption of bilingual consent forms. These steps were necessary because many Latina women who did not understand English well were being sterilized in the United States at the time, without proper consent.

While the widespread immigration marches flourished throughout the U.S. in the Spring of 2006, the Chicano Movement continued to expand in its focus and its active participants. As of the 21st Century, a major focus of the Chicano Movement has been to increase the (intelligent) representation of Chicanos in mainstream American media and entertainment. There are also many community education projects to educate Latinos about their voice and power like South Texas Voter Registration Project. SVREP's mission is to empower Latinos and other minorities by increasing their participation in the American democratic process. Members of the beginning of the Chicano movement, like Faustino Erebia Jr., still speak about their trials and the changes they have seen over the years.

The movement started small in Colorado yet spread across the states becoming a worldwide movement for equality. While there are many poets who helped carry out the movement, Corky Gonzales was able to spread the Chicano issues worldwide through "The Plan Espiritual de Aztlán." This manifesto advocated Chicano nationalism and self-determination for Mexican Americans. In March 1969 it was adopted by the First National Chicano Liberation Youth Conference based in Colorado. Adolfo Ortega says, "In its core as well as its fringes, the Chicano Movement verged on strivings for economic, social, and political equality." This was a simple message that any ordinary person could relate to and want to strive for in their daily lives. Whether someone was talented or not they wanted to help spread the political message in their own way. While majority of the group consisted of Mexican-Americans many people of other nationalities wanted to help the movement. This helped moved the movement from the fringes into the more mainstream political establishment. The "Political Establishment" typically consisted of the dominant group or elite that holds power or authority in a nation. Many successful organizations were formed, such as the Mexican American Youth Organization, to fight for civil rights of Mexican Americans. During the early 1960s in Texas many Mexican-Americans were treated like second class citizens and discriminated against. While progress has been made for equality immigrants even to this day are still a target of misunderstanding and fear. Chicano Poetry was a safe way for political messages to spread without fear of being targeted for by speaking out. Politically, the movement was also broken off into sections like chicanismo. "Chicanismo meant to some Chicanos dignity, self respect, pride, uniqueness, and a feeling of a cultural rebirth." Mexican-Americans wanted to embrace the color of their skin instead of it being something to be ashamed of. Many Mexican-Americans unfortunately had it ingrained on them through society that it was better socially and economically to act "White" or "Normal." The movement wanted to break that mindset and embrace who they were and be loud and proud of it. A lot of people in the movement thought it was acceptable to speak Spanish to one another and not be ashamed of not being fluent in English. The movement encouraged to not only discuss tradition with other Mexican-Americans but others not within the movement. America was a land of immigrants not just for the social and economically accepted people. The movement made it a point not to exclude others of other cultures but to bring them into the fold to make everyone understanding of one another. While America was new for many people of Latin descent it was important to celebrate what made them who they were as a culture. Entertainment was powerful tool to spread their political message inside and out of their social circles in America. Chicanismo might not be discussed frequently in the mainstream media but the main points of the movement are: self-respect, pride, and cultural rebirth. 
 
This is a list of the major epicenters of the Chicano Movement.

Chicanas in the movement 

While Chicanas are typically not covered as heavily in literature about the Chicano movement, Chicana feminists have begun to re-write the history of women in the movement. Chicanas who were actively involved within the movement have come to realize that their intersecting identities of being both Chicanas and women were more complex than their male counterparts. Through the involvement of various movements, the main goal of these Chicanas was to include their intersecting identities within these movements, specifically choosing to add women's issues, racial issues, and LGBTQ issues within movements that ignored such identities. One of the biggest women's issues that the Chicanas faced was that Mexican men drew their masculinity from forcing traditional female roles on women and expecting women to bear as many children as they could.

Sociologist Teresa Cordova, when discussing Chicana feminism, has stated that Chicanas change the discourse of the Chicano movement that disregard them, as well as oppose the hegemonic feminism that neglects race and class. Through the Chicano movement, Chicanas felt that the movement was not addressing certain issues that women faced under a patriarchal society, specifically addressing material conditions. Within the feminist discourse, Chicanas wanted to bring awareness to the forced sterilization many Mexican women faced during the 1970s. The film No Mas Bebes describes the stories of many of these women who were sterilized without consent. Although Chicanas have contributed significantly to the movement, Chicana feminists have been targeted; they are targeted because they are seen as betraying the movement and being anti-family and anti-men. By creating a platform that was inclusive to various intersectional identities, Chicana theorists who identified as lesbian and heterosexual were in solidarity of both. With their navigation through patriarchal structures, and their intersecting identities, Chicana feminists brought issues such as political economy, imperialism, and class identities to the forefront of the movement's discourses. Enriqueta Longeaux and Vasquez discussed in the Third World Women's Conference, "There is a need for world unity of all peoples suffering exploitation and colonial oppression here in the U.S., the most wealthy, powerful, expansionist country in the world, to identify ourselves as third world peoples in order to end this economic and political expansion."

Geography 
Scholars have paid some attention to the geography of the movement and situate the Southwest as the epicenter of the struggle. However, in examining the struggle's activism, maps allow us to see that activity was not spread evenly through the region and that certain organizations and types of activism were limited to particular geographies. For instance, in southern Texas where Mexican Americans comprised a significant portion of the population and had a history of electoral participation, the Raza Unida Party started in 1970 by Jose Angel Gutierrez hoped to win elections and mobilize the voting power of Chicanos. RUP thus became the focus of considerable Chicano activism in Texas in the early 1970s.

The movement in California took a different shape, less concerned about elections. Chicanos in Los Angeles formed alliances with other oppressed people who identified with the Third World Left and were committed to toppling U.S. imperialism and fighting racism. The Brown Berets, with links to the Black Panther Party, was one manifestation of the multiracial context in Los Angeles. The Chicano Moratorium antiwar protests of 1970 and 1971 also reflected the vibrant collaboration between African Americans, Japanese Americans, American Indians, and white antiwar activists that had developed in Southern California.

Chicano student activism also followed particular geographies. MEChA established in Santa Barbara, California, in 1969, united many university and college Mexican American groups under one umbrella organization. MEChA became a multi-state organization, but an examination of the year-by-year expansion shows a continued concentration in California. The Mapping American Social Movements digital project shows maps and charts demonstrating that as the organization added dozens then hundreds of chapters, the vast majority were in California. This should cause scholars to ask what conditions made the state unique, and why Chicano students in other states were less interested in organizing MEChA chapters?

Political activism

In 1949 and 1950, the American G.I. Forum initiated local "pay your poll tax" drives to register Mexican American voters. Although they were unable to repeal the poll tax, their efforts did bring in new Latino voters who would begin to elect Latino representatives to the Texas House of Representatives and to Congress during the late 1950s and early 1960s.

In California, a similar phenomenon took place. When World War II veteran Edward R. Roybal ran for a seat on the Los Angeles City Council, community activists established the Community Service Organization (CSO). The CSO was effective in registering 15,000 new voters in Latino neighborhoods. With this newfound support, Roybal was able to win the 1949 election race against the incumbent councilman and became the first Mexican American since 1886 to win a seat on the Los Angeles City Council.

The Mexican American Political Association (MAPA), founded in Fresno, California, came into being in 1959 and drew up a plan for direct electoral politics. MAPA soon became the primary political voice for the Mexican-American community of California.

Student walkouts

After World War II, Chicanos began to assert their own views of their own history and status as Mexican Americans in the US and they began to critically analyze what they were being taught in public schools. Many young people, like David Sanchez and Vickie Castro, founders of the Brown Berets, found their voices in protesting the injustices they saw.

In the late 1960s, when the student movement was active around the globe, the Chicano Movement inspired its own organized protests like the East L.A. walkouts in 1968, and the National Chicano Moratorium March  in Los Angeles in 1970. The student walkouts occurred in Denver and East LA in 1968. There were also many incidents of walkouts outside of the city of Los Angeles, as far as Kingsville, Tx in South Texas, where many students were jailed by the county and protests ensued. In the LA County high schools of El Monte, Alhambra, and Covina (particularly Northview), the students marched to fight for their rights. Similar walkouts took place in 1978 in Houston high schools to protest the discrepant academic quality for Latino students. There were also several student sit-ins which objected the decreasing funding of Chicano courses.

The blowouts of the 1960s can be compared to the 2006 walkouts, which were done in opposition to the Illegal Immigration Control bill.

Student and youth organizations

Chicano student groups such as the United Mexican American Students (UMAS), the Mexican American Youth Association (MAYA) in California, and the Mexican American Youth Organization in Texas, developed in universities and colleges in the mid-1960s. South Texas had a local chapter of MAYO that also made significant changes to the racial tension in this area at the time. Members included Faustino Erebia Jr, local politician and activist, who has been a keynote speaker at Texas A&M University at the annual Cesar Chavez walk.  At the historic meeting at the University of California, Santa Barbara in April 1969, the diverse student organizations came together under the new name Movimiento Estudiantil Chicano de Aztlán (MECHA). Between 1969 and 1971, MECHA grew rapidly in California with major centers of activism on campuses in southern California, and a few chapters were created along the East coast at Ivy League Schools. By 2012, MECHA had more than 500 chapters throughout the U.S. Student groups such as these were initially concerned with education issues, but their activities evolved to participation in political campaigns and to various forms of protest against broader issues such as police brutality and the U.S. war in Southeast Asia.  The Brown Berets, a youth group which began in California, took on a more militant and nationalistic ideology.

The UMAS movement garnered great attention in Boulder, Colorado after a car bombing killed several UMAS students. In 1972, UMAS students at the University of Colorado Boulder were protesting the university's attitude towards UMAS issues and demands.  Over the next two years hostilities had increased and many students were concerned about the leadership of the UMAS and Chicano movements on the CU Boulder Campus. On May 27, 1974, Reyes Martinez, an attorney from Alamosa, Colorado, Martinez's girlfriend, Una Jaakola, CU Boulder alumna University of Colorado Boulder, and Neva Romero, an UMAS student attending CU Boulder, were killed in a car bombing at Boulder's Chautauqua Park. Two days later another car bomb exploded in the Burger King parking lot at 1728 28th St. in Boulder, killing Francisco Dougherty, 20, Florencio Grenado, 31, and Heriberto Teran, 24, and seriously injuring Antonio Alcantar.  It was later determined both explosions were caused by homemade bombs composed of up to nine dynamite sticks.  Most of the victims were involved in the UMAS movement in Boulder, Colorado. They came to be known as Los Seis de Boulder.  Many students in the UMAS and Chicano movement believed the bombing was directly correlated to the students' demands and rising attention on the Chicano movement. An arrest was never made in connection with the car bombing.

A University of Colorado Boulder Master of Fine Arts student, Jasmine Baetz, created an art exhibit in 2019 dedicated to Los Seis de Boulder.  The art exhibit is a seven-foot-tall rectangular sculpture that includes six mosaic tile portraits. The depiction of each activist faces the direction in which he or she died. It currently sits in front of the TB-1 building east of Macky Auditorium on the CU-Boulder campus. Baetz, a Canadian, had by chance seen the film Symbols of Resistance, a documentary about Los Seis de Boulder, in 2017.  She became inspired to create a piece of art to honor the activists.  She invited community participation in the project; over 200 people worked on it in some capacity.  The base of the sculpture states, “Dedicated in 2019 to Los Seis de Boulder & Chicana and Chicano students who occupied TB-1 in 1974 & everyone who fights for equity in education at CU Boulder & the original stewards of this land who were forcibly removed & all who remain.” It also states, “Por Todxs Quienes Luchan Por La Justicia” (for all those who fight for justice).  CU students have protested a campus decision not to make the art exhibit permanent.  CU announced the exhibit would be made permanent in September 2020.

A memorial in honor of Los Seis de Boulder was installed at Chautauqua Park in Boulder on May 27, 2020, at the location of the first car bomb explosion exactly 46 years ago.  The City of Boulder provided a $5000 grant for the memorial which the Colorado Chautauqua Association's Buildings and Grounds Committee and the City of Boulder Landmarks Review Committee approved.  Family members of the deceased gathered to watch as the stone monument was put in place.

Anti-war activism
The Chicano Moratorium was a movement by Chicano activists that organized anti-Vietnam War demonstrations and activities throughout the Southwest and other Mexican American communities from November 1969 through August 1971. The movement focused on the disproportionately high death rate of Mexican American soldiers in Vietnam as well as the discrimination faced at home. After months of demonstrations and conferences, it was decided to hold a National Chicano Moratorium demonstration against the war on August 29, 1970. The march began at Belvedere Park in LA and headed towards Laguna Park (since renamed Ruben F. Salazar Park) alongside 20,000 to 30,000 people. The Committee members included Rosalio Muñoz and Corky Gonzales and only lasted one more year, but the political momentum generated by the Moratorium led many of its activists to continue their activism in other groups. The rally became violent when there was a disturbance in Laguna Park. There were people of all ages at the rally because it was intended to be a peaceful event. The sheriffs who were there later claimed that they were responding to an incident at a nearby liquor store that involved Chicanos who had allegedly stolen some drinks. The sheriffs also added that upon their arrival they were hit with cans and stones. Once the sheriff arrived, they claimed the rally to be an "unlawful assembly" which turned violent. Tear gas and mace were everywhere, demonstrators were hit by billy clubs and arrested as well. The event that took place was being referred to as a riot, some have gone as far to call it a "Police Riot" to emphasize that the police were the ones who initiated it

The LA Protest brought many chicanos together and got support from other areas like Denver, Colorado who brought one hundred members and affiliates. On August 29, 1970 this was the largest rebellious movement of color since Watts uprising of (1965). More than 150 people were arrested and four were killed some accidental. A report from the Los Angeles Times stated, Gustav Montag got in direct contact with the police when they began opening fire in an alley and Gustav's defense was to throw broken pieces of concrete at the officers. The article stated the police officers were aiming over his head in attempts to scare him off. Montag was pictured being carried away from the scene by several brothers and was later announced dead at the scene. Montag was a Sephardic Jew who supported the movement.

Relations with Police 

Edward J. Escobar details in his work the relationship between various movements and demonstrations within the Chicano Movement and the Los Angeles Police Department between the years 1968–1971. His main argument explores how "police violence, rather than subduing Chicano movement activism, propelled that activism to a new level -- a level that created a greater police problem than had originally existed". At one Chicano Moratorium (also referred to as the National Chicano Moratorium) demonstration as part of the Anti-war activism, popular journalist Ruben Salazar was killed by police after they shot a tear-gas projectile into the Silver Dollar Café where he was after covering the moratorium demonstration and succeeding riots. This is an example Escobar presents that inspired political consciousness in an even broader base of Mexican-Americans, many considering him a "martyr".

Relations between Chicano activists and the police mirrored those with other movements during this time. As Escobar states, Black Civil Rights activists in the 50s and 60s "set the stage by focusing public attention on the issue of racial discrimination and legitimizing public protest as a way to combat discrimination." Marginalized communities began using this public platform to speak against injustices they had been experiencing for centuries at the hands of the U.S. government, perpetuated by police departments and other institutions of power. Like many of the movements during this time, Chicanos took inspiration from the Black Panther Party and used their race, historically manipulated to disenfranchise them, as a source of cultural nationalism and pride.

Edward J. Escobar claims the Chicano Movement and its sub-organizations were infiltrated by local law enforcement and the Federal Bureau of Investigation (FBI) to acquire information and cause destabilization from within the organizations. Methods used by law enforcement included "red-baiting, harassment and arrest of activists, infiltration and disruption of movement organizations, and violence." Agent provocateurs were oftentimes planted in these organizations to disrupt and destabilize the movements from within. Repression from law enforcement broadened Chicano political consciousness, their identities in relation to the larger society, and encouraged them to focus their efforts in politics. 

There are also cases involving Central American activists and the police that sparked activism within the greater Chicano Movement. One case is that of Los Siete de la Raza and their altercation with two policemen in San Francisco's Mission District in 1969.

Chicano art
 

Art of the Movement was the burgeoning of Chicano art fueled by heightened political activism and energized cultural pride. Chicano visual art, music, literature, dance, theater and other forms of expression have flourished. During the 20th century, an emergence of Chicano expression developed into a full-scale Chicano Art Movement. Chicanos developed a wealth of cultural expression through such media as painting, drawing, sculpture and printmaking. Similarly, novels, poetry, short stories, essays and plays have flowed from the pens of contemporary Chicano writers.

Operating within the Chicano art movement is the concept “rasquachismo,” which comes from the Spanish term “rasquache.” This term is used to describe something that is of lower quality or status and is often correlated with groups in a society that fit this description and have to become resourceful to get by. Chicano artists being resourceful can be seen when artists cut up tin cans and flatten them out into rectangles to use as canvases. In addition to its influence in the visual arts, the concept “rasquachismo” informs Chicano performing arts. El Teatro Campesino’s La Carpa de los Rasquachis is a play written by Luis Valdez in 1972, which tells the story of a farmworker that has migrated to the United States from Mexico; this play teaches the audience to look for ways to be resourceful.

Chicano Art developed around the 1960s during the Chicano Liberation Movement.  In its beginning stages, Chicano art was distinguished by the expression through public art forms. Many artists saw the need for self-representation because the media was trying to suppress their voices. Chicano artists during this time used visual arts, such as posters and murals in the streets, as a form of communication to spread the word of political events affecting Chicano culture; UFW strikes, student walkouts, and anti-war rallies were a few of the main topics depicted in such art. Artists like Andrew  Zermeño reused certain symbols recognizable from Mexican culture, such as skeletons and the Virgen de Guadalupe, in their own art to create a sense of solidarity between other oppressed groups in the United States and globally. In 1972, the group ASCO, founded by Gronk, Willie Herrón, and Patssi Valdez, created conceptual art forms to engage in Chicano social protests; the group utilized the streets of California to display their bodies as murals to draw attention from different audiences.

Chicano artists created a bi-cultural style that included US and Mexican influences. The Mexican style can be found by their use of bright colors and expressionism. The art has a very powerful regionalist factor that influences its work. 
Examples of Chicano muralism can be found in California at the historic Estrada Courts Housing Projects in Boyle Heights.  Another example is La Marcha Por La Humanidad, which is housed at the University of Houston.

Chicano performing arts also began developing in the 1960s with the creation of bilingual Chicano theater, playwriting, comedy, and dance. Recreating Mexican performances and staying in line with the “rasquachismo” concept, Chicanos performed skits about inequalities faced by people within their culture on the back of trucks. The group ASCO also participated in the performing art form by having “guerrilla” performances in the streets. This art form spread to the spoken word in 1992 when a collection of Chicana spoken word was recorded on compact disc. Chicano comedians have also been publicly known since the 1980s, and in 1995, the first televised Chicano comedy series was produced by Culture Clash.

About 20 years after the Chicano Movement, Chicano artists were affected by political priorities and societal values, and they were also becoming more accepted by society. They were becoming more interested making pieces for the museums and such, which caused Chicano art to become more commercialized, and less concerned with political protest.

Chicano art has continued to expand and adapt since the Chicano Movement. Today the Millennial Chicano generation has begun to redefine the Chicano art space with modernized forms of self-expression, although some artists still try to preserve the traditional Chicano art forms. As the community of Chicano artists expands and diversifies, Chicano art can no longer fit under just one aesthetic. The younger generation takes advantage of technology to create art and draws inspiration from other cultural art forms, such as Japanese anime and hip hop. Chicano art is now defined by the experimentation of self-expression, rather than producing art for social protests.

Chicano press 

The Chicano press was an important component of the Chicano Movement to disseminate Chicano history, literature, and current news. The press created a link between the core and the periphery to create a national Chicano identity and community. The Chicano Press Association (CPA) created in 1969 was significant to the development of this national ethos. The CPA argued that an active press was foundational to the liberation of Chicano people, and represented about twenty newspapers, mostly in California but also throughout the Southwest.

Chicanos at many colleges campuses also created their own student newspapers, but many ceased publication within a year or two, or merged with other larger publications. Organizations such as the Brown Berets and MECHA also established their own independent newspapers. Chicano communities published newspapers like El Grito del Norte from Denver and Caracol from San Antonio, Texas.

Over 300 newspapers and periodicals in both large and small communities have been linked to the Movement.

Chicano Religion 
Many in the Chicano Movement were influenced by their Catholic identities. The most famous activist who heavily relied on Catholic influence and practices was Cesar Chávez. Fasting was common by many activists though who would only break their fasts to consume communion. The Virgin of Guadalupe was also used as a symbol of inspiration during many protests. The Chicano Movement was often inspired by their religious convictions to continue the tradition of commitment to social change and asserting their rights. There was also influence from indigenous forms of religion combined with Catholic beliefs. Altars would be set up by the matriarchs of families that often included both Catholic symbols and indigenous religious symbols. Both Catholic beliefs and the inclusion of indigenous religious practices were influenced many in the Chicano Movement to continue their protests and fight to equality.

Aztlán

The concept of Aztlán as the place of origin of the pre-Columbian Mexican civilization became a symbol for various Mexican nationalist and indigenous movements.

The name Aztlán was first taken up by a group of Chicano independence activists led by Oscar Zeta Acosta during the Chicano movement of the 1960s and 1970s. They used the name "Aztlán" to refer to the lands of Northern Mexico that were annexed by the United States as a result of the Mexican–American War. Combined with the claim of some historical linguists and anthropologists that the original homeland of the Aztecan peoples was located in the southwestern United States even though these lands were historically the homeland of many American Indian tribes (e.g. Navajo, Hopi, Apache, Comanche, Shoshone, Mojave, Zuni and many others). Aztlán in this sense became a "symbol" for mestizo activists who believed they have a legal and primordial right to the land, although this is disputed by many of the American Indian tribes currently living on the lands they claim as their historical homeland. Some scholars argue that Aztlan was located within Mexico proper. Groups who have used the name "Aztlán" in this manner include Plan Espiritual de Aztlán, MEChA (Movimiento Estudiantil Chicano de Aztlán, "Chicano Student Movement of Aztlán").

Many in the Chicano Movement attribute poet Alurista for popularizing the term Aztlán in a poem presented during the Chicano Youth Liberation Conference in Denver, Colorado, March 1969.

See also
 Adela Sloss Vento
 Chicano
 Chicanismo
 Chicano nationalism
 Chicano studies
 Chicano/a Movement in Washington State History Project
 El Chicano
 Mario Cantu

References

Further reading
 Gómez-Quiñones, Juan, and Irene Vásquez. Making Aztlán: Ideology and Culture of the Chicana and Chicano Movement, 1966-1977 (2014)
 Meier, Matt S., and Margo Gutiérrez. Encyclopedia of the Mexican American civil rights movement (Greenwood 2000) online
 Orozco, Cynthia E. No Mexicans, women, or dogs allowed: The rise of the Mexican American civil rights movement (University of Texas Press, 2010) online
 Rosales, F. Arturo. Chicano! The history of the Mexican American civil rights movement (Arte Público Press, 1997); online

External links

 "La Batalla Está Aquí": The Chicana/o Movement in Los Angeles, interview series, Center for Oral History Research, UCLA Library Special Collections, University of California, Los Angeles.
 Mexican-American.org – Network of the Mexican American Community
 NetworkAztlan.com - Network Aztlan
 Chicana community search page
 Chicano Newspapers and Periodicals 1969-1979 A map of Chicano press across the country from 1969 to 1970 based on serial listings collected by the University of California Libraries.

Chicano
Chicano nationalism
History of civil rights in the United States
Mexican-American culture
Mexican-American history
Nonviolent resistance movements
Defunct American political movements
Latin American culture
Hispanic and Latino American
Hispanic and Latino American history
History of Latino civil rights
Counterculture of the 1960s